Adeptia is a Chicago-based software company. It provides an application to exchange business data with other companies using a self-service integration approach. This business software helps organizations create automated data connections to their customers and partners, and automate pre-processing and post-processing steps such as data validation, exception handling and back-end data integration.

Adeptia's products are designed to help on-board customer data, implement real-time interfaces between systems, connecting with cloud applications, automate business processes, publishing APIs, Electronic Data Interchange (EDI) integration and to enable Service-oriented architecture (SOA). Adeptia is being used by organizations in various industries including Insurance, Financial Services, Manufacturing, Logistics, Government, Health care and retail. Adeptia technology provides Data Integration, Enterprise Application Integration (EAI), and Business-to-business (B2B) Integration software capabilities.
 
Adeptia technology has been developed using Java, XML and Web Services technologies. They are available in both traditional on-premises and cloud-delivery models. For cloud deployments, Adeptia utilizes the Amazon Elastic Compute Cloud (EC2).

Adeptia is notable for being the most comprehensive "all-in-one" business integration software on the market that combines Data Integration, Enterprise Application Integration, and Business-to-Business EDI capability on a core SOA architecture.

History

Adeptia was founded in 2000 and is headquartered in Chicago, IL.  It has a wholly owned Research and Development Center in New Delhi, India.

In November 2014, Lou Ennuso, CEO of Adeptia, was inducted as a member of the University of Illinois at Chicago (UIC) Entrepreneurship Hall of Fame.

Gartner included Adeptia in the Data Integration Magic Quadrant in 2013, 2014, 2015, 2016, 2017, 2018, 2019, 2020.

Gartner also included Adeptia in the Application Integration Magic Quadrant in 2013 and 2014.

Forrester Research included Adeptia in the Hybrid Integration Wave in 2014.

See also

 Enterprise Application Integration
 Enterprise service bus
 Comparison of business integration software

References

External links
 Adeptia website

Software companies established in 2000
Software companies based in Illinois
Companies based in Chicago
EDI software companies
Software companies of the United States
2000 establishments in Illinois